Chichawatni is a city in the Sahiwal District of the Punjab province of Pakistan. It is the administrative center of Chichawatni Tehsil. In 2011, Chichawatni's population was estimated at approximately 160,000.

History
From the beginning of the 7th century Rajput Bhatti kingdoms dominated eastern portions of Pakistan and northern India. In 997 CE, Sultan Mahmud Ghaznavi, took over the Ghaznavid dynasty empire established by his father, Sultan Sebuktegin, In 1005 he conquered the Shahis in Kabul in 1005, and followed it by the conquests of some western Punjab region. Eastern Regions of Punjab from Multan to Rawalpindi in north (Including region of present-day Faisalabad, previously called Lyallpur) remained under Rajput rule until 1193. The Delhi Sultanate and Mughal Empire later ruled the region.
The Punjab region became predominantly Muslim due to the missionary Sufi saints work among the people of Punjab. Sufi dargahs (mausoleums) dot the landscape of Punjab region today. After the decline of the Mughal Empire, the Sikh Empire invaded and occupied Sahiwal District. During the British Raj, Chichawatni was reputedly transformed from a small Punjabi village into a relatively modern city by infrastructure investment and planning decrees, starting after the First World War. At the time of independence of Pakistan in 1947, most Indian Muslim families migrated from Punjab towns like Ludhiana, Jallandhar, Amritsar and Firozpur, and settled in towns like Chichawatni, shaping the city's present-day Muslim population. The predominantly Muslim population supported Muslim League and the Pakistan Movement. After the independence of Pakistan in 1947, the minority Hindus and Sikhs migrated to India from the old northwestern Punjab areas, while the Muslim refugees from the northeastern Punjab areas of India migrated to the northwestern Punjab areas including to the Sahiwal District area as one of them, between the newly-drawn national boundaries of Pakistan and India by the departing British. In other words, old British Punjab province was divided into 2 new Punjabs – 'Muslim-majority Punjab' and 'Sikh and Hindu majority Punjab' in 1947.
Chichawatni is also home to popular Wedding halls located on the Grand Trunk road. Chichawatni is a vast agricultural area producing, Cotton, Corn, Wheat and a vast variety of other fruits and vegetables.

Overview
Chichawatni presently serves as the main city of Sahiwal Division, and is administratively subdivided into three City Union Councils and 34 rural Union Councils. It is also the headquarters of Chichawatni Tehsil. It furthermore serves as the educational hub for many local villages, offering several colleges and institutions for higher education. Punjabi is the most-spoken language in Sahiwal, including Chichawatni, although Urdu is also commonly spoken.

Forest division

Chichawatni city is the headquarters of a Pakistani forest division. The local forested area is called  Chichawatni Reserved Forest. During the War of Independence of 1857, local people fought against the British in this forest. In Second world war, many foreign prisoners were brought and confined here in this forest. Two decades later, when these plants became trees, a unique resource was added to the biosphere in the form of honey. The Peregrine Fund, a U.S.-based avian conservation organisation, conducted research in Chichawatni's forests in the early 2000s.

Cattle market
Chichawatni's cattle market, known as Mandi Muwaishiyan, is among the largest in Pakistan. Typically, the market runs from the 21st of each month to the end of the month.

Kabbadi stadium
Kabbadi – a team sport similar to wrestling – is popular in Chichawatni, which is home to one of the few flood-light Kabbadi stadiums in Pakistan. The town has played host to numerous Kabbadi championships.

Rail links
In 1918, Chichawatni's first railway station was constructed, but its position, in the largely impassable forest to the north of the town, made it difficult to reach, despite the expansion of the station in 1927. In July 2007. A new and more accessible railway station was constructed in Chichawatni.

Government investment
In recent years, the Government of Punjab has invested significantly into education in Chichawatni, leading to a rapid increase in the local literacy rate. In partnership with private interests, local authorities have also invested into ICT education, improving the computer skills of school and college students in Chichawatni. Numerous municipal parks and museums have also been constructed with government aid.

See also
Chichawatni railway station
Forestry in Pakistan

References

External links
Satellite view of Chichawatni

Populated places in Sahiwal District
Sahiwal District